Cesare Attolini is a luxury menswear brand founded in Naples the 1930s by Vincenzo Attolini. The company is based in Casalnuovo di Napoli, Italy.

Brand
The brand is run by Vincenzo Attolini grandsons Giuseppe and Massimiliano Attolini. Attolini helped to promote the Neapolitan silhouette featuring slim lines, high armholes, and soft-shouldered jackets.

Retail locations are in Naples, Milan, Bal Harbour, New York City, Baku, Miami and Istanbul.

See also 
Made in Italy

References

External links
Official Website
G'fellas Apparel

Italian companies established in 1930
Clothing brands of Italy
Clothing companies established in 1930
Italian suit makers
Fashion accessory brands
High fashion brands
Luxury brands
Menswear designers
Privately held companies of Italy
Design companies established in 1930
Companies based in Naples